Holbrook is an unincorporated community in west central Oneida County, Idaho, United States.

History
Holbrook was settled in the late 1890s by residents of Mendon, Utah and surrounding areas who were drawn to the area due to the availability of land to homestead. The town is named after Heber Angell Holbrook, an early Mormon Bishop in the town.

Holbrook's population was estimated at 100 in 1909, and was just 10 in 1960.

In 2013, a triple murder occurred in Holbrook.

References

External links
 Idaho Transportation Department SH-38 traffic camera at Holbrook

Unincorporated communities in Idaho
Unincorporated communities in Oneida County, Idaho